Tito's Blue Train is the popular name of the luxury, former state train of Yugoslav Marshal Josip Broz Tito, president of the former Yugoslavia. More than 60 statesmen and world leader traveled on the blue train during its service and now operated as a tourist attraction on the  Belgrade–Bar railway, between Belgrade, capital of Serbia, and Bar, a coastal town in Montenegro.

Tito's era 

Officially, a state train was first used by Tito in 1946. Blue-painted saloon carriages specially made for Tito and blue-painted locomotives were used as vehicles from 1956. The wagon construction factories »GOŠA« in Smederevska Palanka and » Boris Kidrič « in Maribor were commissioned to build the wagons. Fine woods (mahogany, walnut and cherry) were used for the interior, complete with Art Deco interior design features. In addition to Tito's saloon car with its cabinet room, the composition also had a dining car, as well as a covered transport vehicle. The operational station of the Plavi voz was and is the Topčider station in the prominent district of Dedinje, not far from Tito's Belgrade residence. It was also used to take Tito and his wife to the Brijuni islands in Croatia during the summer and hostings meetings with important foreign dignitaries. Among those who travelled on the train as Tito's guests were Haile Selassie, François Mitterrand, Yasser Arafat, Jawaharlal Nehru, Sukarno and, in October 1972, Queen Elizabeth II. After Tito's death the train transported his coffin from Ljubljana to Belgrade.

Train compositions
The Blue Train has a formal lounge with a dining room, three lounge cars with apartments, a kitchen, a restaurant and a special closed baggage car for transporting cars. It has a total of 92 places, and the full capacity of the sleeping cars is 90 beds. The interior of the train is made mostly of wood. Mahogany, pear and walnut were used, and the lounges and corridors were decorated with inlays.

Kola restaurant (series WR, 88-69) 
This car consists of a dining room with 28 seats, a lounge with 8 seats, a bar and a kitchen. The maximum traffic speed is 140 km/h. "NO" exchange mode; as a result the unit can travel only in the Blue train set. The cars have a sound system (internal, which is two-channel and external) and telephone installations. The car is heated by steam.

Salon apartments (Salon series, 89-69)

The first round was Josip Broz's salon - apartment. They are air-conditioned and consist of two suites with one bed each, a study, a bathroom, a lounge area, two armchairs, and a wardrobe with a “annexe” lined walls in silk wallpaper used by the president’s “companion”. The other cars have two luxurious and four double beds, a work cabinet, a bathroom, a lounge for eight people and a kitchenette. They are air-conditioned. "NO" exchange mode. They can travel only in the Blue train set. The cars have a sound system (internal, which is two-channel and external) and telephone installations, and steam heated.

Formal salon - dining room (Salon series, 89-69)
These saloon cars are air-conditioned. The banquet hall has a capacity of 28 seats, while the lounge area has 10 armchair seats. The cars are equipped with a full-channel sound system and a cinema projector. "NO" exchange mode. They can travel only in the Blue train set. The cars also have telephone installations. The car is heated by steam.

Kola - kitchen (series SK, 88-69)
The cars of the SK series are kitchen cars and must be coupled with energy cars from the Blue Train. Meal preparation capacity is 300 meals. They can travel only in the Blue train set. The circuit is powered by electricity 3 x 300 volts, 50 Hz, and heated by steam. The cars are equipped with telephone and sound system installations (internal, which is two-channel and external). "NO" exchange mode.

Cars for transporting cars (series MD, 98-30) 
Cars of the MD series are closed single-deck luggage cars for transporting cars. They are equipped with devices for washing the car during the trip. I can travel in regular trains. The capacity of the MD car is 4 cars. The maximum permitted height of vehicles that can be loaded is 1.75 meters. The car has a through-line electric heating system, its own HAGENUK heating, two or one extra bed for the car companion. The maximum speed . "NO" exchange mode.

Salon cars (Salon series, 09-80)  
The capacity of the car is ten double beds and one single (6 cabins). They have a lounge area, a vacuum toilet, a bathroom in the main cabin, a kitchen. The cars are air-conditioned. The maximum speed of these cars is 160 km/h. "RIC" exchange mode. Circuit type "Z". I can travel in regular trains. The cars are not part of the Blue Train. They have a 56 kW MERCEDES diesel generator and a HAGENUK multi-system car heating device with the option of choosing a heating source: electricity, oil or steam.

Staff
In addition to rolling stock, the staff in the Special Train Service was also necessary to efficiently operate the special train. It numbered from 20 to 32 workers with a tendency to reduce them in accordance with the modernization of work and the transfer of some jobs to the then ŽTO.

Locomotives 
The first dedicated locomotives for the Blue Train were three repainted JŽ class 11 4-8-0; one of them is now preserved in Belgrade. They were replaced by three Krauss-Maffei ML 2200 C'C' purchased from West Germany. These were classified as JŽ D66/761 engines and were based on DB Class V 200.

In 1978, four Electro-Motive Division EMD JT22CW-2 locomotives, designated as ŽS series 666, were acquired by Yugoslav Railways for use with the train, hence their all-blue livery. All four are no longer operational and stored, awaiting full overhaul. They were named after World War II battles:

 001 - 
 002 - 
 003 - 
 004 -

Diesel engine train

The Blue Train includes a self-propelled motor saloon and an apartment-type saloon trailer with air conditioning, built in Germany in 1961 and extended in 1962 in Maribor. The capacity of the self-propelled salon is six cabins (12 double beds); the salon has a kitchen, its own heating source and the possibility of electric heating from a diesel generator. The train has two independent diesel engines and develops a speed of 120 km/h.

After Tito

The train carried Tito with his wife Jovanka for the last time to transfer Tito's body from Ljubljana via Zagreb to Belgrade on 5 May 1980. In the days between the death of the president and the state funeral, Yugoslav media showed crowds of citizens standing along the train's route in Slovenia, Croatia and Serbia to pay their respects.

The Blue Train's last official state tour was conducted under President Slobodan Milošević during the celebration of the 600th anniversary of the Battle of the Field of Blackbirds  on 28 June 1989 by taking the Blue train to Gazimestan, where Milošević delivered his Blackbird Field speech. After that, the Plavi voz was no longer used as a symbol of a state and power insignia for official public events. In the years that followed, as Yugoslavia broke up, the Blue Train was left in a siding sheds at the Topčider depot in Belgrade, its the locomotives used to haul freight and passenger trains. The carrages sat unused until 2004, when it was first opened to the general public, i.e. to domestic and foreign tourists. Finally, the ordinary world had the opportunity to get acquainted with the unattainable luxury of the train, which had previously been used by more than 60 foreign statesmen and state delegations. Since 2007, parts of Blue train have been used for tourist trips. Since the end of 2009, one composition with a saloon wagon has been running on the Belgrade–Bar railway line every day. Some of the non-functioning carriages and rolling stock can be visited for a fee.

Gallery

See Also 
 Belgrade-Bar railway
 JŽ class 11
 JŽ D66/761s (DB Class V 200 based engines) of Tito's Blue Train.
 JŽ 666 (EMD JT22CW-2)
 Rail transport in Montenegro
 Serbian Railways

References

External links 

 Video of the train's interior
 Pictures
 Description of a tourist journey
 „Службена страница „Плави воз“ - Желтурист“
 Плави воз (Историја - Оружје онлајн, Драги Ивић, 2021) 
 „Титов салон гости друге“, В. Новости, С. С. Ровчанин, 05. децембар 2007.
 “Плејбој” у Титовом возу, В. Новости, Марко Лопушина, 13, јануар 2011.
 „Британци воле да се возе Титовим Плавим возом“, В. Новости, 01. март 2014.
 Опет “бруји” Сутјеска,  В. Новости, Б. Ца. - Ј. М. 25. фебруар 2015.
 Повратак локомотиве 666-003, познатије као „Сутјеска“, РТС, 25. фебруар 2015.
 
 
 Завера на прузи („Вечерње новости“, 25. септембар 2015)
 Занемарена локомотива „Плавог воза” („Политика”, 9. мај 2019)
 „Плаву локомотиву” чека пресељење са Савског трга („Политика”, 28. фебруар 2022)

Serbian Railways
Montenegrin Railways
Socialist Federal Republic of Yugoslavia
Blue Train
Tourist attractions in Montenegro
Luxury trains
Rail transport of heads of state